Elizabeth of Brandenburg-Küstrin (29 August 1540 – 8 March 1578), was a princess of Brandenburg-Küstrin and margravine of Brandenburg-Ansbach and Brandenburg-Kulmbach by marriage.

Life 
Elizabeth was the elder of two daughters of Margrave John of Brandenburg-Küstrin (1513–1571) from his marriage to Catherine of Brunswick-Wolfenbüttel (1518–1574), daughter of the Duke Henry V of Brunswick-Lüneburg.

On 26 December 1558 Elisabeth married Margrave George Frederick I of Brandenburg-Ansbach-Kulmbach (1539–1603) in Küstrin.  From 1577, he acted as governor in the Duchy of Prussia on behalf of Albert Frederick, Duke of Prussia.

Elisabeth died during her stay at the Warsaw court, where her husband was to be awarded the ducal title by the Polish king Stefan Batory.  Elizabeth was buried in Königsberg Cathedral.  Her husband ordered the Dutch sculptor Willem van Bloche to create a grave monument for her.  It was completed in 1582 and was erected as a "governor monument" in the Cathedral.

|-
 

|-

References 
 Andrea Baresel-Brand: grave monuments of northern European royal houses in the Age of the Renaissance 1550-1650, Ludwig Verlag, 2007, p. 149 ff.
 C.J. St. Czilsky: Princess Elizabeth of Brandenburg: a historical picture of life during the Reformation, Martens, 1859, p. 342

People from the Margraviate of Brandenburg
1540 births
1578 deaths
Margravines of Germany
Daughters of monarchs